Phi Aurigae, Latinized from φ Aurigae, is a giant star in the northern constellation of Auriga. It is faintly visible to the naked eye with an apparent visual magnitude of 5.089.

This is an evolved giant star with a stellar classification of K3 IIIp and an estimated radius equal to 16 times the radius of the Sun. The outer envelope has an effective temperature of 4,367 K, giving it the cool orange-hued glow of a K-type star.

References

External links
 HR 1805
 CCDM J05277+3429
 Image Phi Aurigae

035620
058051
Aurigae, Phi
Auriga (constellation)
K-type giants
Aurigae, 24
1805
BD+34 1048